The STARFLEET International Conference is the annual business conference where members of STARFLEET: The International Star Trek Fan Association, Inc. meet the organization's leadership. The conference includes leadership meetings, information sessions, a formal banquet, an awards ceremony, and other events and entertainment.

History
STARFLEET is a nonprofit corporation based in North Carolina, and the conference also serves as the required annual meeting of the corporation where members of the Board of Directors, referred to as the Admiralty Board, and the officers of the corporation, known as the Executive Committee, meet in session. Initially called the "National Conference," the International Conference has been hosted in the United States because the majority of STARFLEET's membership resides in that country. Most conferences are stand-alone events, but some have been associated with nearby conventions; for example, in 1995, the conference was part of DragonCon in Atlanta, Georgia. Conference guests have included Vaughn Armstrong, Casey Biggs, Robin Curtis, Richard Herd, J. G. Hertzler, Chase Masterson, Colm Meaney, Tim Russ, Roger Stern and Fred W. Haise.

In 2020, because of the COVID-19 Pandemic, the 2020 IC2020 was delayed until November.  Due to the lateness of the event, a Virtual IC2020 was held ahead of the actual IC2020 online using ZOOM on August 1, 2020.  In early September 2020, IC2020 at BayCon in San Mateo, California was cancelled by the STARFLEET Board of Directors, the Admiralty Board, due to the COVID-19 Pandemic.  Both IC2021 and 2022 were scheduled for Tallahassee, Florida in June of those years but it was deemed that the Pandemic and its subsequent spike would affect it and the site managers agreed to push it back first to 2022 and then to 2023.

In December 2022, the STARFLEET Board of Directors (Admiralty Board), citing continued concerns of the COVID Viruses, voted to cancel the event.  On January 5, 2023, the IC Committee announced that a team has been awarded the next Virtual IC.

Locations
 1986 - June 13 to June 15 - St. Louis, Missouri - 1st Starfleet Conference, held at the Clarion Hotel in association with Archon 10 fan convention.
 1987 - July 10 to July 12 - Hunt Valley, Maryland - Held at the Hunt Valley Inn, in association with Shore Leave IX.
 1988 - June 16 to June 19 - Cleveland, Ohio - Held at the Cleveland Convention Center, this National Conference was combined with International Superman Convention and the 7th annual Neovention gaming convention.
 1989 - August 25 to August 27 - San Jose, California Held at the LaBaron Hotel in association with TimeCon 89.
 1990 - August 31 to September 2 - Kansas City, Missouri - Held at Adam's Mark Hotel in association with Delecon One.
 1991 - July 12 to July 14 - Hunt Valley, Maryland - Held again at the Hunt Valley Inn, in association with Shore Leave XIII.
 1992 - July 3 to July 5 - Kansas City, Missouri - Kansas City Marriot Hotel, in association with Delecon Two.  Special charity events at the 1992 IC raised money to benefit the Children's Miracle Network.
 1993 - July 2 to July 4 - Arlington, Texas - Held at the Arlington Convention Center, the IC was branded as "Tex-Trek '93" and some events were opened to the public. Guests included actor Colm Meaney.
 1994 - July 17 to July 19 - Orlando, Florida - Held at Orlando North Hilton in conjunction with Vulkon 94
 1995 - July 13 to July 16 - Atlanta, Georgia - Held at Ramada Downtown in conjunction with Dragon Con/NASFIC

-- From 1986 to 1995 All Starfleet National Conferences were held in conjunction with another convention.  1996 marked the beginning of stand-alone Starfleet International Conferences --

 1996 - August 30 to September 1 - Oklahoma City, Oklahoma - Held at Oklahoma City La Quinta
 1997 - August 22 to August 24 - Cherry Hill, New Jersey - Held at Cherry Hill Hilton Hotel
 1998 - July 3 to July 5 - Lubbock, Texas - Held at Holiday Inn and Towers
 1999 - August 6 to August 8 - Charlotte, North Carolina - Held at Charlotte Marriott Executive Park
 2000 - September 1 to September 3 - Burlington, Vermont - Held at Sheraton Burlington Hotel
 2001 - July 27 to July 29 - Kansas City, Missouri - Held at Kansas City Airport Marriott
 2002 - August 1 to August 4 - San Jose, California - Held at DoubleTree Hotel Airport
 2003 - July 31 to August 3 - Greensboro, North Carolina - Held at Holiday Inn Airport
 2004 - July 29 to August 1 - Birmingham, Alabama - Held at Marriot Grandview
 2005 - July 1 to July 3 - San Antonio, Texas - Held at Hilton San Antonio Airport - Guests included Richard Herd, Vaughn Armstrong, and Casey Biggs.
 2006 - August 4 to August 6 - Philadelphia, Pennsylvania - Held at Embassy Suites Philadelphia Airport
 2007 - August 9 to August 12 - Denver, Colorado - Held at Adams Mark Hotel - Included guest Tim Russ
 2008 - June 27 to June 29 -  Ithaca, New York - Held at Ithaca Ramada Airport Inn - This IC's theme was "Back to School" and special guests included actors J. G. Hertzler and Robin Curtis, and Superman author Roger Stern.
 2009 - August 6 to August 9 - Greensboro, North Carolina - Held at Greensboro Airport Marriot - With the theme "One Small Step, One Giant Leap", this IC celebrated the 40th anniversary of the Apollo 11 moon landing as well as the 35th Anniversary of STARFLEET International.  The special guest was Apollo 13 astronaut Fred W. Haise.
 2010 - July 30 to August 1 - Sequoyah State Park, Wagoner, Oklahoma - The "Wagon Train to the Stars" theme reflects the Oklahoma setting and echoes a phrase Gene Roddenberry used to describe Star Trek to television network executives.
 2011 - August 12 to August 14 - Held at The Inn at Pocono Manor, Mount Pocono, Pennsylvania
 2012 - August 3 to August 5 - Held at Whispering Woods Resort, Memphis, Tennessee - "Trekkin' on the Mississippi" - Included Guest: Rod Roddenberry
 2013 - August 1 to August 4 - Held at MCM Elegante Hotel, Dallas, Texas - "Year of the Phoenix" - Included Guest: Vaughn Armstrong
 2014 - August 8 to August 10 - Held at The Clock Tower Resort and Convention Center, Rockford, Illinois - "Time is Fleeting", Celebrating the 40th Anniversary of STARFLEET: The International Star Trek Fan Association, Inc.
 2015 - August 21 to August 23 - Held at The Conference & Event Center, Niagara Falls, New York - "Honeymoon in STARFLEET"
 2016 - August 12 to August 14 - Held at Crown Plaza Louisville Airport, Louisville, Kentucky - "Trekkin' II: Horsing around on the Ohio!"
 2017 - August 18 to August 20 - New Orleans, Louisiana - Held at the Crown Plaza New Orleans Airport.
 2018 - August 10 to August 12 - Minneapolis, Minnesota - Held at Hilton Minneapolis/St. Paul Airport Mall of America - "Family Reunion".
 2019 - August 2 to August 5 - St. Louis, Missouri  - Held at the Marriott St. Louis Airport. A new convention, IDIC Con, attempted to use the International Conference funds to spin-off, but failed.
 2020 - August 1 - Virtual IC2020 - Hosted online on Zoom (software) by the Starfleet International Conference Committee.  IC2020 was to be held in San Mateo, California was CANCELLED by the Admiralty Board, due to the COVID-19 Pandemic.
 2021 - August 7 - Virtual IC2021 - Hosted by the STARFLEET International Conference Committee.  It was to be in Tallahassee, Florida but this event was postponed until 2022 due to the ongoing COVID-19 Pandemic. 
 2022 - August 13 - Virtual IC2022 - Hosted by the STARFLEET International Conference Committee.  The event was postponed until 2023 due to the spike in the new Omnicrom variant as well as other variants of COVID-19.  This is the third straight Virtual IC.
 2023 - Date TBD - VirtualIC2023 - As the Tallahassee International Conference having been CANCELLED due to continued COVID concerns by the STARFLEET Board of Directors (Admiralty Board).

References

External links
 STARFLEET, the International Star Trek Fan Association, Inc.

Star Trek fandom
Recurring events established in 1990